Wrexham Albion were a Welsh football and cricket club from Wrexham.

History
The name Wrexham Albion first appears in the cricket fixtures in August 1867.

The first mention of the team as a football club appeared in November 1877. The football club played its home games at Chester Road, Wrexham.

The club are recorded as playing in White shirts and short, with Red and Black hooped socks.

The team entered the Welsh Cup in 1879-80.

In the close season of 1880, the players of Albion (Wrexham) Football Club were amalgamated into Wrexham Football Club to provide additional depth and strength to the first and second teams.

The Wrexham Albion name briefly made a come back in 1887-88 and again in 1890-91.

Cup history

Notable players

References

Defunct football clubs in Wales
Sport in Wrexham
Sport in Wrexham County Borough
Football clubs in Wrexham